

Events

Pre-1600
1364 – Troops of the Republic of Pisa and the Republic of Florence clash in the Battle of Cascina.
1540 – Henry VIII of England marries his fifth wife, Catherine Howard, on the same day his former Chancellor, Thomas Cromwell, is executed on charges of treason.
1571 – La Laguna encomienda, known today as the Laguna province in the Philippines, is founded by the Spaniards as one of the oldest encomiendas (provinces) in the country.

1601–1900
1635 – In the Eighty Years' War, the Spanish capture the strategic Dutch fortress of Schenkenschans.
1656 – Second Northern War: Battle of Warsaw begins.
1778 – Constitution of the province of Cantabria ratified at the Assembly Hall in Bárcena la Puente, Reocín, Spain.
1794 – French Revolution: Maximilien Robespierre and Louis Antoine de Saint-Just are executed by guillotine in Paris, France.
1808 – Mahmud II became Sultan of the Ottoman Empire and Caliph of Islam.
1809 – Peninsular War: Battle of Talavera: Sir Arthur Wellesley's British, Portuguese and Spanish army defeats a French force led by Joseph Bonaparte.
1821 – José de San Martín declares the independence of Peru from Spain.
1854 – , the last all-sail warship built by the United States Navy and now a museum ship in Baltimore Harbor, is commissioned.
1864 – American Civil War: Battle of Ezra Church: Confederate troops make a third unsuccessful attempt to drive Union forces from Atlanta, Georgia.
1866 – At the age of 18, Vinnie Ream becomes the first and youngest female artist to receive a commission from the United States government for a statue (of Abraham Lincoln).
1868 – The 14th Amendment to the United States Constitution is certified, establishing African American citizenship and guaranteeing due process of law.
1883 – A moderate earthquake measuring magnitude 4.3–5.2 strikes the Italian island of Ischia, killing over 2,300 people.
1896 – The city of Miami is incorporated.

1901–present
1911 – The Australasian Antarctic Expedition began as the SY Aurora departed London. 
1914 – In the culmination of the July Crisis, Austria-Hungary declares war on Serbia, igniting World War I.
1915 – The United States begins a 19-year occupation of Haiti. 
1917 – The Silent Parade takes place in New York City, in protest against murders, lynchings, and other violence directed towards African Americans.
1932 – U.S. President Herbert Hoover orders the United States Army to forcibly evict the "Bonus Army" of World War I veterans gathered in Washington, D.C.
1935 – First flight of the Boeing B-17 Flying Fortress.
1938 – Hawaii Clipper disappears between Guam and Manila as the first loss of an airliner in trans-Pacific China Clipper service.
1939 – The Sutton Hoo helmet is discovered.
1942 – World War II: Soviet leader Joseph Stalin issues Order No. 227. In response to alarming German advances, all those who retreat or otherwise leave their positions without orders to do so are to be tried in a military court, with punishment ranging from duty in a shtrafbat battalion, imprisonment in a Gulag, or execution.
1943 – World War II: Operation Gomorrah: The Royal Air Force bombs Hamburg, Germany causing a firestorm that kills 42,000 German civilians.
1945 – A U.S. Army B-25 bomber crashes into the 79th floor of the Empire State Building killing 14 and injuring 26.
1957 – Heavy rain and a mudslide in Isahaya, western Kyushu, Japan, kills 992.
1960 – The German Volkswagen Act comes into force.
1962 – Beginning of the 8th World Festival of Youth and Students
1965 – Vietnam War: U.S. President Lyndon B. Johnson announces his order to increase the number of United States troops in South Vietnam from 75,000 to 125,000.
1973 – Summer Jam at Watkins Glen: Nearly 600,000 people attend a rock festival at the Watkins Glen International Raceway.
1974 – Spetsgruppa A, Russia's elite special force, was formed.
1976 – The Tangshan earthquake measuring between 7.8 and 8.2 moment magnitude flattens Tangshan in the People's Republic of China, killing 242,769 and injuring 164,851.
1984 – Olympic Games: Games of the XXIII Olympiad: The summer Olympics were opened in Los Angeles. 
1996 – The remains of a prehistoric man are discovered near Kennewick, Washington. Such remains will be known as the Kennewick Man.
2001 – Australian Ian Thorpe becomes the first swimmer to win six gold medals at a single World Championship meeting.
2002 – Nine coal miners trapped in the flooded Quecreek Mine in Somerset County, Pennsylvania, are rescued after 77 hours underground.
  2002   – Pulkovo Aviation Enterprise Flight 9560 crashes after takeoff from Sheremetyevo International Airport in Moscow, Russia, killing 14 of the 16 people on board.
2005 – The Provisional Irish Republican Army calls an end to its thirty-year-long armed campaign against British rule in Northern Ireland.
2010 – Airblue Flight 202 crashes into the Margalla Hills north of Islamabad, Pakistan, killing all 152 people aboard. It is the deadliest aviation accident in Pakistan history and the first involving an Airbus A321.
2011 – While flying from Seoul, South Korea to Shanghai, China, Asiana Airlines Flight 991 develops an in-flight fire in the cargo hold. The Boeing 747-400F freighter attempts to divert to Jeju International Airport, but crashes into the sea South-West of Jeju island, killing both crew members on board.
2017 – Prime Minister of Pakistan, Nawaz Sharif was disqualified from office for life by Supreme Court of Pakistan after finding him guilty of corruption charges.
2018 – Australian Wendy Tuck becomes the first woman skipper to win the Clipper Round the World Yacht Race.

Births

Pre-1600
1347 – Margaret of Durazzo, Queen of Naples and Hungary (d. 1412)
1458 – Jacopo Sannazaro, Italian poet, humanist and epigrammist (d.1530)
1516 – William, Duke of Jülich-Cleves-Berg, German nobleman (d. 1592)

1601–1900
1609 – Judith Leyster, Dutch painter (d. 1660)
1645 – Marguerite Louise d'Orléans, French princess (d. 1721)
1659 – Charles Ancillon, French jurist and diplomat (d. 1715)
1746 – Thomas Heyward, Jr., American judge and politician (d. 1809)
1750 – Fabre d'Églantine, French actor, playwright, and politician (d. 1794)
1783 – Friedrich Wilhelm von Bismarck, German army officer and writer (d. 1860)
1796 – Ignaz Bösendorfer, Austrian businessman, founded the Bösendorfer Company (d. 1859)
1804 – Ludwig Feuerbach, German anthropologist and philosopher (d. 1872)
1815 – Stefan Dunjov, Bulgarian colonel (d. 1889)
1844 – Gerard Manley Hopkins, English poet (d. 1889)
1857 – Ballington Booth, English-American activist, co-founded Volunteers of America (d. 1940)
1860 – Elias M. Ammons, American businessman and politician, 19th Governor of Colorado (d. 1925)
  1860   – Grand Duchess Anastasia Mikhailovna of Russia (d. 1922)
1863 – Huseyn Khan Nakhchivanski, Russian general (d. 1919)
1866 – Beatrix Potter, English children's book writer and illustrator (d. 1943)
  1866   – Albertson Van Zo Post, American fencer (d. 1938)
1867 – Charles Dillon Perrine, American-Argentinian astronomer (d. 1951)
1872 – Albert Sarraut, French journalist and politician, 106th Prime Minister of France (d. 1962)
1874 – Ernst Cassirer, Polish-American philosopher and academic (d. 1945)
1879 – Lucy Burns, American activist, co-founded the National Woman's Party (d. 1966)
  1879   – Stefan Filipkiewicz, Polish painter (d. 1944)
1887 – Marcel Duchamp, French-American painter and sculptor (d. 1968)
  1887   – Willard Price, Canadian-American journalist and author (d. 1983)
1893 – Rued Langgaard, Danish organist and composer (d. 1952)
1896 – Barbara La Marr, American actress and screenwriter (d. 1926)
1898 – Lawrence Gray, American actor (d. 1970)

1901–present
1901 – Freddie Fitzsimmons, American baseball player, coach, and manager (d. 1979)
  1901   – Rudy Vallée, American actor, singer, and saxophonist (d. 1986)
1902 – Albert Namatjira, Australian painter (d. 1959)
  1902   – Sir Karl Popper, Austrian-English philosopher and academic (d. 1994)
1907 – Earl Tupper, American inventor and businessman, founded Tupperware Brands (d. 1983)
1909 – Aenne Burda, German publisher (d. 2005)
  1909   – Malcolm Lowry, English novelist and poet (d. 1957)
1914 – Carmen Dragon, American conductor and composer (d. 1984)
1915 – Charles Hard Townes, American physicist and academic, Nobel Prize laureate (d. 2015)
  1915   – Dick Sprang, American illustrator (d. 2000)
  1915   – Frankie Yankovic, American polka musician (d. 1998)
1916 – David Brown, American journalist and producer (d. 2010)
1920 – Andrew V. McLaglen, English-American director and producer (d. 2014)
1922 – Jacques Piccard, Belgian-Swiss oceanographer and engineer (d. 2008)
1923 – Ray Ellis, American conductor and producer (d. 2008)
1924 – Luigi Musso, Italian racing driver (d. 1958)
  1924   – C. T. Vivian, American minister, author, and activist (d. 2020)
1925 – Baruch Samuel Blumberg, American physician and academic, Nobel Prize laureate (d. 2011)
1926 – Charlie Biddle, American-Canadian bassist (d. 2003)
1927 – John Ashbery, American poet (d. 2017)
1929 – Jacqueline Kennedy Onassis, American journalist and socialite, 37th First Lady of the United States (d. 1994)
  1929   – Shirley Ann Grau, American novelist and short story writer (d. 2020)
1930 – Firoza Begum, Bangladeshi singer (d. 2014)
  1930   – Junior Kimbrough, American singer and guitarist (d. 1998)
  1930   – Jean Roba, Belgian author and illustrator (d. 2006)
  1930   – Ramsey Muir Withers, Canadian general (d. 2014)
1931 – Alan Brownjohn, English poet and author
  1931   – Johnny Martin, Australian cricketer (d. 1992)
1932 – Natalie Babbitt, American author and illustrator (d. 2016)
  1932   – Carlos Alberto Brilhante Ustra, Brazilian colonel (d. 2015)
1933 – Charlie Hodge, Canadian ice hockey player and scout (d. 2016)
1934 – Jacques d'Amboise, American dancer and choreographer (d. 2021)
1935 – Neil McKendrick, English historian and academic
1936 – Russ Jackson, Canadian football player and coach
  1936   – Garfield Sobers, Barbadian cricketer
1937 – Francis Veber, French director and screenwriter
1938 – Luis Aragonés, Spanish footballer, coach, and manager (d. 2014)
  1938   – Arsen Dedić, Croatian singer-songwriter and poet (d. 2015)
  1938   – Alberto Fujimori, Peruvian engineer, academic, and politician, 90th President of Peru
  1938   – Chuan Leekpai, Thai lawyer and politician, 20th Prime Minister of Thailand
1941 – Bill Crider, American author (d. 2018)
  1941   – Riccardo Muti, Italian conductor and educator
  1941   – Susan Roces, Filipino actress and producer (d. 2022)
1942 – Tonia Marketaki, Greek director and screenwriter (d. 1994)
1943 – Mike Bloomfield, American guitarist and songwriter (d. 1981)
  1943   – Bill Bradley, American basketball player and politician
  1943   – Richard Wright, English singer-songwriter and keyboard player (d. 2008)
1945 – Jim Davis, American cartoonist, created Garfield
1946 – Jonathan Edwards, American singer-songwriter and guitarist
  1946   – Linda Kelsey, American actress
  1946   – Fahmida Riaz, Pakistani poet and activist (d. 2018)
1947 – Peter Cosgrove, Australian general and politician, 26th Governor General of Australia
  1947   – Sally Struthers, American actress 
1948 – Gerald Casale, American singer-songwriter, guitarist, and director 
  1948   – Eiichi Ohtaki, Japanese singer-songwriter and producer (d. 2013)
1949 – Vida Blue, American baseball player and sportscaster
  1949   – Randall Wallace, American screenwriter and producer
1950 – Shahyar Ghanbari, Iranian singer-songwriter
  1950   – Tapley Seaton, Kittitian politician, 4th Governor-General of Saint Kitts and Nevis
1951 – Santiago Calatrava, Spanish architect and engineer, designed the Athens Olympic Sports Complex
  1951   – Doug Collins, American basketball player and coach
  1951   – Gregg Giuffria, American rock musician and businessman 
  1951   – Ray Kennedy, English footballer (d. 2021)
1952 – Vajiralongkorn, King of Thailand
1954 – Hugo Chávez, Venezuelan colonel and politician, President of Venezuela (d. 2013)
  1954   – Gerd Faltings, German mathematician and academic
  1954   – Steve Morse, American singer-songwriter and guitarist 
  1954   – Mikey Sheehy, Irish footballer
1956 – John Feinstein, American journalist and author 
  1956   – Robert Swan, English explorer
1958 – Terry Fox, Canadian runner and activist (d. 1981)
  1958   – Michael Hitchcock, American actor, producer, and screenwriter
1959 – William T. Vollmann, American novelist, short story writer and journalist
1960 – Luiz Fernando Carvalho, Brazilian director, producer, and screenwriter
  1960   – Jon J. Muth, American author and illustrator
  1960   – Yōichi Takahashi, Japanese illustrator
1961 – Yannick Dalmas, French racing driver
1962 – Rachel Sweet, American singer, television writer, and actress
1964 – Lori Loughlin, American actress
1965 – Priscilla Chan, Hong Kong singer
1966 – Sossina M. Haile, Ethiopian American chemist 
  1966   – Miguel Ángel Nadal, Spanish footballer 
  1966   – Jimmy Pardo, American stand-up comedian, actor, and host
  1966   – Shikao Suga, Japanese singer-songwriter and guitarist
1967 – Taka Hirose, Japanese bass player 
1969 – Garth Snow, American ice hockey player and manager
  1969   – Alexis Arquette, American actress (d. 2016)
1970 – Michael Amott, Swedish guitarist and songwriter 
  1970   – Isabelle Brasseur, Canadian figure skater
  1970   – Paul Strang, Zimbabwean cricketer and coach
1971 – Abu Bakr al-Baghdadi, Iraqi leader of the Islamic State of Iraq and the Levant (d. 2019)
  1971   – Ludmilla Lacueva Canut, Andorran writer
  1971   – Stephen Lynch, American singer-songwriter and actor
  1971   – Annie Perreault, Canadian speed skater
1972 – Robert Chapman, English cricketer
1973 – Marc Dupré, Canadian singer-songwriter and guitarist 
  1973   – Steve Staios, Canadian ice hockey player
1974 – Alexis Tsipras, Greek engineer and politician, 186th Prime Minister of Greece
  1974   – Elizabeth Berkley, American actress
1975 – Leonor Watling, Spanish actress 
1976 – Jacoby Shaddix, American singer-songwriter 
1977 – Aki Berg, Finnish-Canadian ice hockey player
  1977   – Manu Ginóbili, Argentinian basketball player
  1977   – Miyabiyama Tetsushi, Japanese sumo wrestler
1978 – Kārlis Vērdiņš, Latvian poet
  1978   – Hitomi Yaida, Japanese singer-songwriter and guitarist 
1979 – Henrik Hansen, Danish footballer
  1979   – Birgitta Haukdal, Icelandic singer-songwriter and producer 
  1979   – Lee Min-woo, South Korean singer-songwriter and dancer
  1979   – Alena Popchanka, Belarusian-French swimmer and coach
1981 – Michael Carrick, English footballer
1983 – Sam Dastyari, Iranian-Australian politician
1983     – Ilir Latifi, Swedish-Kosovar mixed martial artist
  1983   – Cody Hay, Canadian figure skater
1984 – Zach Parise, American ice hockey player
1985 – Mathieu Debuchy, French footballer
  1985   – Dustin Milligan, Canadian actor, producer, and screenwriter
1986 – Alexandra Chando, American actress
  1986   – Lauri Korpikoski, Finnish ice hockey player
1987 – Yevhen Khacheridi, Ukrainian-Greek footballer
  1987   – Pedro, Spanish footballer
1990 – Soulja Boy, American rapper, producer, and actor
  1990   – Simone Pizzuti, Italian footballer
1992 – Spencer Boldman, American actor
1993 – Harry Kane, English footballer
  1993   – Cher Lloyd, English singer
1994 – Choi Hyo-jung, South Korean singer
1996 – Harriet Dart, British tennis player 
2000 – Emile Smith Rowe, English footballer

Deaths

Pre-1600
 450 – Theodosius II, Roman emperor (b. 401)
 631 – Athanasius I Gammolo, Syriac Orthodox Patriarch of Antioch.
 938 – Thankmar, half-brother of Otto I (during Siege of Eresburg) (b. c. 908)
 942 – Shi Jingtang, emperor of Later Jin (b. 892)
1057 – Victor II, pope of the Catholic Church (b. 1018)
1128 – William Clito, English son of Sybilla of Conversano (b. 1102)
1230 – Leopold VI, Duke of Austria (b. 1176)
1271 – Walter de Burgh, 1st Earl of Ulster (b. 1220)
1285 – Keran, Queen of Armenia ( b. before 1262)
1333 – Guy VIII of Viennois, Dauphin of Vienne (b. 1309)
1345 – Sancia of Majorca, queen regent of Naples (b. c. 1285)
1458 – John II, king of Cyprus and Armenia (b. 1418)
1488 – Edward Woodville, Lord Scales (at the Battle of St. Aubin-du-Cormier)
1508 – Robert Blackadder, bishop of Glasgow
1527 – Rodrigo de Bastidas, Spanish explorer, founded the city of Santa Marta (b. 1460)
1540 – Thomas Cromwell, English lawyer and politician, Chancellor of the Exchequer (b. 1495)
1585 – Francis Russell, 2nd Earl of Bedford (b. 1527)

1601–1900
1631 – Guillén de Castro y Bellvis, Spanish playwright (b. 1569)
1655 – Cyrano de Bergerac, French poet and playwright (b. 1619)
1667 – Abraham Cowley, English poet and author (b. 1618)
1675 – Bulstrode Whitelocke, English lawyer and politician (b. 1605)
1685 – Henry Bennet, 1st Earl of Arlington, English politician and diplomat, Secretary of State for the Southern Department (b. 1618)
1718 – Étienne Baluze, French scholar and academic (b. 1630)
1741 – Antonio Vivaldi, Italian violinist and composer (b. 1678)
1750 – Johann Sebastian Bach, German organist and composer (b. 1685)
1762 – George Dodington, 1st Baron Melcombe, English politician, Lord Lieutenant of Somerset (b. 1691)
1794 – Maximilien Robespierre, French politician, (b. 1758)
  1794   – Louis Antoine de Saint-Just, French soldier and politician (b. 1767)
1808 – Selim III, Ottoman sultan (b. 1761)
1809 – Richard Beckett, English cricketer and captain (b.1772)
1818 – Gaspard Monge, French mathematician and engineer (b. 1746)
1835 – Édouard Mortier, duc de Trévise, French general and politician, 15th Prime Minister of France (b. 1768)
1836 – Nathan Mayer Rothschild, German-English banker and financier (b. 1777)
1838 – Bernhard Crusell, Finnish composer (b. 1775)
1842 – Clemens Brentano, German author and poet (b. 1778)
1844 – Joseph Bonaparte, French diplomat and brother of Napoleon (b. 1768)
1849 – Charles Albert of Sardinia (b. 1798)
1869 – Jan Evangelista Purkyně, Czech anatomist and physiologist (b. 1787)
1878 – George Law Curry, American publisher and politician (b. 1820)
1885 – Moses Montefiore, British philanthropist, sheriff and banker (b. 1784)
1895 – Edward Beecher, American minister and theologian (b. 1803)

1901–present
1930 – John DeWitt, American hammer thrower (b. 1881)
  1930   – Allvar Gullstrand, Swedish ophthalmologist and optician, Nobel Prize laureate (b. 1862)
1933 – Nishinoumi Kajirō III, Japanese sumo wrestler, 30th yokozuna (b. 1890)
1934 – Marie Dressler, Canadian-American actress and singer (b. 1868)
  1934   – Louis Tancred, South African cricketer and pilot (b. 1876)
1935 – Meletius IV of Constantinople (b. 1871)
1942 – Flinders Petrie, English archaeologist and academic (b. 1853)
1946 – Saint Alphonsa,  first woman of Indian origin to be canonized as a saint by the Catholic Church (b. 1910)
1957 – Edith Abbott, American economist, social worker, and educator (b. 1876)
  1957   – Isaac Heinemann, German-Israeli scholar and academic (b. 1876)
1965 – Edogawa Ranpo, Japanese author and critic (b. 1894)
  1965   – Attallah Suheimat, Jordanian politician (b. 1875)
1967 – Karl W. Richter, American lieutenant and pilot (b. 1942)
1968 – Otto Hahn, German chemist and academic, Nobel Prize laureate (b. 1879)
1969 – Ramón Grau, Cuban physician and politician, 6th President of Cuba (b. 1882)
  1969   – Frank Loesser, American composer (b. 1910)
1971 – Lawrence Moore Cosgrave, Canadian colonel and diplomat (b. 1890)
  1971   – Myril Hoag, American baseball player (b. 1908)
  1971   – Charles E. Pont, French-American minister and painter (b. 1898)
1972 – Helen Traubel, American soprano and actress (b. 1903)
1976 – Maggie Gripenberg, Finnish dancer and choreographer (b. 1881)
1979 – Don Miller, American football player and coach (b. 1902)
  1979   – Charles Shadwell, English conductor and bandleader (b. 1898)
1980 – Rose Rand, Austrian-born American logician and philosopher (b. 1903)
1981 – Stanley Rother, American priest and missionary (b. 1935)
1982 – Keith Green, American singer-songwriter and pianist (b. 1953)
1987 – Jack Renshaw, Australian politician, 31st Premier of New South Wales (b. 1909)
1990 – Jill Esmond, English actress (b. 1908)
1992 – Sulev Nõmmik, Estonian actor and director (b. 1931)
1993 – Stanley Woods, Irish motorcycle racer (b. 1903)
1996 – Roger Tory Peterson, American ornithologist and academic (b. 1908)
1997 – Rosalie Crutchley, English actress (b. 1920)
  1997   – Seni Pramoj, Thai lawyer and politician, 6th Prime Minister of Thailand (b. 1905)
1998 – Zbigniew Herbert, Polish poet and author (b. 1924)
  1998   – Lenny McLean, English boxer, actor, and author (b. 1949)
  1998   – Consalvo Sanesi, Italian racing driver (b. 1911)
1999 – Trygve Haavelmo, Norwegian economist and mathematician, Nobel Prize laureate (b. 1911)
2000 – Abraham Pais, Dutch-American physicist and historian (b. 1918)
2001 – Ahmed Sofa, Bangladeshi poet, author, and critic (b. 1943)
2002 – Archer John Porter Martin, English chemist and academic, Nobel Prize laureate (b. 1910)
2003 – Valerie Goulding, Irish activist and politician (b. 1918)
2004 – Francis Crick, English biologist and biophysicist, Nobel Prize laureate (b. 1916)
  2004   – Tiziano Terzani, Italian journalist and author (b. 1938)
2006 – David Gemmell, English author (b. 1948)
2007 – Karl Gotch, Belgian-American wrestler and trainer (b. 1924)
  2007   – Jim LeRoy, American soldier and pilot (b. 1961)
2009 – Jim Johnson, American football player and coach (b. 1941)
2011 – Abdul Fatah Younis, Libyan general (b. 1944)
2012 – Colin Horsley, New Zealand-English pianist and educator (b. 1920)
  2012   – Sepp Mayerl, Austrian mountaineer (b. 1937)
  2012   – William F. Milliken Jr., American race car driver and engineer (b. 1911)
2013 – Mustafa Adrisi,  Ugandan general and politician, 3rd Vice President of Uganda (b. 1922)
  2013   – Eileen Brennan, American actress and singer (b. 1932)
  2013   – Rita Reys, Dutch jazz singer (b. 1924)
  2013   – William Scranton, American captain and politician, 13th United States Ambassador to the United Nations (b. 1917)
  2013   – Ersilio Tonini, Italian cardinal (b. 1914)
2014 – Alex Forbes, Scottish footballer and manager (b. 1925)
  2014   – Alakbar Mammadov, Azerbaijani footballer and manager (b. 1930)
2015 – Jan Kulczyk, Polish businessman (b. 1950)
  2015   – Edward Natapei, Vanuatuan politician, 6th Prime Minister of Vanuatu (b. 1954)
  2015   – Clive Rice, South African cricketer and coach (b. 1949)
2016 – Émile Derlin Zinsou, Beninese politician (b. 1918)
  2016   – Mahasweta Devi, Indian Bengali fiction writer and socio-political activist (b. 1926)
2018 – Wanny van Gils, Dutch footballer (b. 1959)
2020 – Junrey Balawing, Filipino record holder (b. 1993)
2021 – Dusty Hill, American musician (b. 1949)
2022 – Bernard Cribbins, British actor (b. 1928)

Holidays and observances
Christian feast day:
Alphonsa Muttathupadathu (Syro-Malabar Catholic Church)
Botvid
Johann Sebastian Bach, George Frederick Handel, Henry Purcell (Episcopal Church commemoration)
Johann Sebastian Bach, Heinrich Schütz, George Frederick Handel (Lutheran commemoration)
Nazarius and Celsus
Pedro Poveda Castroverde
Pope Innocent I
Pope Victor I
Samson of Dol
July 28 (Eastern Orthodox liturgics)
Day of Commemoration of the Great Upheaval (Canada)
Fiestas Patrias, celebrates the independence of Peru from Spain by General José de San Martín in 1821.
Liberation Day (San Marino)
Ólavsøka Eve (Faroe Islands)
Statehood Day (Ukraine)
World Hepatitis Day

References

External links

 
 
 

Days of the year
July